Ilex neblinensis is a species of plant in the family Aquifoliaceae. It is found in Brazil and Venezuela.

References

neblinensis
Vulnerable plants
Taxonomy articles created by Polbot